is a railway station in Bungo-Ōno, Ōita Prefecture, Japan. It is operated by JR Kyushu and is on the Hōhi Main Line.

Lines

Layout 
The station consists of a side and an island platform serving three tracks with a siding branching off track 3. The station building is a wooden structure in western style and houses a waiting area, an automatic ticket vending machine and a staffed ticket window. Access to the island platform is by means of a covered footbridge.

Management of the station has been outsourced to the JR Kyushu Tetsudou Eigyou Co., a wholly owned subsidiary of JR Kyushu specialising in station services. It staffs the ticket booth which is equipped with a Midori no Madoguchi facility.

Adjacent stations

Due to earthquake damage on the Hōhi Main Line, the Aso Boy! From April 2017, the Aso Boy! began operating on an alternative route from  through Ōita to Aso.

History
The track was extended westwards in phases, with  opening as the new western terminus on 27 March 1921. On 2 December 1928, the entire track from Kumamoto through Miemachi to Ōita was designated as the Hōhi Main Line. With the privatization of Japanese National Railways (JNR), the successor of JGR, on 1 April 1987, the station came under the control of JR Kyushu.

On 17 September 2017, Typhoon Talim (Typhoon 18) damaged the Hōhi Main Line at several locations. Services between Aso and Nakahanda, including Miemachi, were suspended and replaced by bus services. Rail service from Aso to Miemachi was restored by 22 September 2017 Normal rail services between Aso and Ōita were restored by 2 October 2017.

Passenger statistics
In fiscal 2016, the station was used by an average of 844 passengers daily (boarding passengers only), and it ranked 185th among the busiest stations of JR Kyushu.

See also
List of railway stations in Japan

References

External links
Miemachi (JR Kyushu)

Railway stations in Ōita Prefecture
Railway stations in Japan opened in 1921
Bungo-ōno, Ōita